"Cotton Fields (The Cotton Song)" (also known as In Them Old Cotton Fields Back Home) is a song written by American blues musician Huddie Ledbetter, better known as Lead Belly, who made the first recording of the song in 1940.

Early versions
Recorded by Lead Belly in 1940, "Cotton Fields" was introduced into the canon of folk music via its inclusion on the 1954 album release Odetta & Larry which comprised performances by Odetta at the Tin Angel nightclub in San Francisco with instrumental and vocal accompaniment by Lawrence Mohr; this version was entitled "Old Cotton Fields at Home". The song's profile was boosted via its recording by Harry Belafonte first on his 1958 album Belafonte Sings the Blues, with a live version appearing on the 1959 concert album Belafonte at Carnegie Hall. Belafonte had learned "Cotton Fields" from Odetta and been singing it in concert as early as 1955. A #13 hit in 1961 for The Highwaymen, "Cotton Fields" served as an album track for a number of C&W and folk-rock acts including Ferlin Husky (The Heart and Soul of Ferlin Husky 1963), The Delltones (Come A Little Bit Closer 1963), Buck Owens (On the Bandstand 1963), the New Christy Minstrels (Chim-Chim-Cheree 1965) and the Seekers (Roving With The Seekers 1964). Odetta also made a new studio recording of the song for her 1963 album One Grain of Sand. The Springfields included "Cotton Fields" on a 1962 EP release; this version is featured on the CD On an Island of Dreams: The Best of the Springfields. "Cotton Fields" was also recorded by Unit 4+2 for their Concrete and Clay album (1965). A rendering in French, "L'enfant do", was recorded in 1962 by Hugues Aufray and Petula Clark.

The Beach Boys cover

American rock band the Beach Boys first recorded "Cotton Fields" on November 18–19, 1968. The track (with Al Jardine on lead vocals) debuted on the group's 1969 album 20/20. It was Jardine's idea for the band to cover the song. He explained:

Dissatisfied with Brian Wilson's baroque pop-influenced arrangement of the song, Jardine prevailed upon the group to record a new version (inspired by the contemporaneous vogue for country rock, as exemplified by such acts as The Flying Burrito Brothers, Stone Poneys and Michael Nesmith & The First National Band) in August 1969. The re-recording featured notable session musician and longtime Nesmith collaborator Orville "Red" Rhodes on pedal steel guitar. Retitled "Cottonfields", the second iteration afforded the Beach Boys their most widespread international success while also denoting the end of the group's hit-making career in the US (although they would enjoy periodic comebacks there). "Cottonfields" would be the final Beach Boys' single released on Capitol Records – the group's label since May 1962 – and their last single released in mono.

While underperforming in the United States (peaking at #95 in Record World and #103 in Billboard) despite a promotional appearance on the short-lived variety show Something Else, the song succeeded across the Atlantic, reaching #5 in the UK Singles Chart (and number 2 on the Melody Maker chart) and later listed as the tenth-biggest seller of the year by the New Musical Express. Outside of North America, it nearly replicated the success of the group's "Do It Again" two years before, peaking at #1 in Australia, and Norway; #2 in Denmark, South Africa and Sweden; #3 in Ireland; #12 in the Netherlands; #13 in New Zealand; and #29 in West Germany. Because of this popularity, it was placed on the international release of the group's Sunflower album. The single achieved sales of over 50,000 copies in Australia, being eligible for the award of a Gold Disc.

The stereo mix found on the Feel Flows box set opens with Al Jardine's son trying to count off the song with the help of his father. Unlike the older Hawthorne, CA stereo mix, this version recreates the reverb effect on the opening vocals.

Chart history

Personnel
Sourced from Craig Slowinski.

Album version
The Beach Boys
Al Jardine – lead vocals, banjo
Brian Wilson – backing vocals, piano, Rhodes piano, producer, arrangement
Additional personnel
Hal Blaine – drums
Ed Carter – guitar, electric bass
Lyle Ritz – upright bass
Bill Peterson, Virgil Evans, Roy Caton – horns
Al Vescovo – banjo, guitar

Single version
The Beach Boys
Al Jardine – lead vocals, guitar, producer, arrangement
Bruce Johnston – keyboards
Mike Love - vocals
Brian Wilson – vocals
Carl Wilson – guitar
Dennis Wilson – drums
Additional personnel
Frank Capp – percussion
Ed Carter – bass
Daryl Dragon – keyboards
Orville "Red" Rhodes – pedal steel guitar
Bill Peterson, Fred Koyen, David Edwards, Ernie Small – horns
The Beach Boys – producer

Creedence Clearwater Revival cover

Creedence Clearwater Revival included their cover of "Cotton Fields" as the third track on their 1969 album Willy and the Poor Boys. Their version hit No. 1 in Mexico in 1970.

Covers
Bill Monroe 1962, Decca Records DL4266
Jimmy Page, at age 13, performed "Cotton Fields" live on television on April 6, 1957, with a skiffle band from Epsom County Pound Lane Primary School. 
In 1962, The Highwaymen (folk band) recorded their version, which peaked at #13 on the US Hot 100 and #3 on the Easy Listening chart.
Teddy Randazzo And The Dazzlers, on his 1962 Album "Teddy Randazzo Twists", ABC-Paramount 45-10350 / 10350 and european single Karusell, KFF 409
Johnny Cash on his 1962 album The Sound of Johnny Cash
Ace Cannon recorded a popular version of the song in 1963.
 The Angels in 1963 that went to No. 119 in the US
Johnny Mann Singers on the 1963 album Golden Folk Song Hits – Liberty LST-7253
Esther & Abi Ofarim performed "Cotton Fields" live on television in 1963 and 1969. They recorded a German version, "Wenn ich bei Dir sein kann", in 1964, which reached the Top 10 in West Berlin.
Eddy Arnold (with the Needmore Creek Singers) on the 1964 album "Folk Song Book"
Rose Marie on episode 102 of The Dick van Dyke Show "The Alan Brady Show Goes to Jail" (1964)
The Carter Sisters on their album The Best of The Carter Family (1966)
Webb Pierce on the 1966 Decca album Webb's Choice
Harry Dean Stanton, in one scene of the 1967 film Cool Hand Luke, plays a sped-up version
Udo Jürgens a 1968 single
Charley Pride on his album Charley Pride in Person released January 1969. 
Elvis Presley in the 1970 movie Elvis: That's the Way It Is
Candies on their album Namida no Kisetsu in English as track 10 in 1974.
 Alamgir in the 1980s, Pakistani pop star
Joe Dassin on 1989 Sony Music compilation Vol.2.
Donna Douglas on her 1989 album Back on the Mountain
The Pogues on their 1989 album Peace and Love (while this version references the original in its lyrics, the song itself is not a cover per se)
Teresa Brewer on The Muppet Show
 Tesla released a cover version as the B-side to the single Call It What You Want, released in 1991
 Red Grammer released a cover version on his album "Red Grammer's Favorite Sing Along Songs" in 1993.
 Kitten recorded a version of the song on their 2007 album Yodeling Cowgirl
 Flatfoot 56 (a Celtic Oi! band) covered it on their album Toil, released in 2012
 Elton John on the Cotton Fields: 16 Legendary Covers From 1969/70 album, released in 2004 
The Springfields
 Ramón Ayala
 James Last on the 1971 album Happyning and reissued on the 4-CD set Beachparty released in 2015.

Lyrics
The original lyrics, written by Lead Belly, state that the fields are "down in Louisiana, just ten miles from Texarkana". Later versions (e.g., Creedence Clearwater Revival's) say the fields are "down in Louisiana, just about a mile from Texarkana". While the twin cities of Texarkana (in Texas and in Arkansas) are about 30 miles north of the Arkansas–Louisiana border, the larger Texarkana metropolitan area directly abuts the Arkansas-Louisiana state line.

Further use 
The song has been taken up by bluegrass musicians far from actual cotton-producing regions; for example, the German skiffle band Die Rhöner Säuwäntzt describe their style as "Musik von den Baumwollfeldern der Rhön," which means "music played in the [imaginary] cotton fields of the Rhön Mountains." In Spanish, the song was covered by the '60s rock and roll group Los Apson titled "Cuando Yo Era Un Jovencito" (When I Was A Young Boy). In order to keep the words sounding similar, the meaning of the song was completely changed. Regional Mexican musician Ramon Ayala also covered the Spanish version of "Cottonfields" in 1989, and it became a well-known hit for years.

References

1963 singles
Songs written by Lead Belly
Lead Belly songs
The Highwaymen (folk band) songs
Creedence Clearwater Revival songs
The Beach Boys songs
Elvis Presley songs
Trini Lopez songs
Harry Belafonte songs
Petula Clark songs
Johnny Cash songs
Elton John songs
Odetta songs
The Pogues songs
Buck Owens songs
Bill Monroe songs
The Angels (American group) songs
Number-one singles in Australia
Number-one singles in Norway
American folk songs
1940 songs
Capitol Records singles
Esther & Abi Ofarim songs